The Liverpool Catholic Club Ice Rink (also known as LCC Sports Complex Liverpool) is an ice sports and public skate centre, built in 1979 and located at the Hoxton Park precinct of Sydney, New South Wales, Australia. It is the home of the LCC Saints Ice Hockey Club, with Junior and Senior Teams.  It has previously served as the home ice rink of the Sydney Ice Dogs in the Australian Ice Hockey League until 2017.

Facilities 

Facilities at LCC Ice Rink are detailed below:

  ice rink (Olympic sized with nets around the rink)
 Capacity of 500 spectators (both seating and standing)
 Skate hire
 Cafe
 Onsite parking

Events 

The rink opened in 2004 and has been the continuous home of the Saints Ice Hockey Club since that time.  The club is community based and offers hockey to players of all ages and abilities.  Sled hockey is also offered.
Between 2009 and 2016, the ice rink annually hosted regular season Australian Ice Hockey League matches involving the Sydney Ice Dogs (originally known as Western Sydney Ice Dogs until 2009) between the months of April and August. In 2016 the Ice Dogs appointed a new General Manager, Jason Juba, who bought a change in direction for the organisation. Jason Juba held negotiations with Macquarie Ice Rink in the off-season and the Sydney Ice Dogs agreed to move to Macquarie for the 2017 AIHL season.

See also
List of ice rinks in Australia
 Sport in New South Wales

References

External links
 
 Australian Ice Hockey League

Ice hockey venues in Australia
Sports venues in Sydney
Indoor arenas in Australia
Figure skating venues in Australia
Speed skating venues in Australia
Liverpool, New South Wales